Kismet is an American silent film version of the 1911 play Kismet by Edward Knoblock, starring Otis Skinner and Elinor Fair, and directed by Louis J. Gasnier.

Skinner's daughter, author Cornelia Otis Skinner, plays a small role. This version was released by Robertson-Cole Distributing Company, and was released on VHS by Grapevine Video. In New England the distribution of the film was handled by Joseph P. Kennedy who organized a successful premiere in Boston.

Skinner filmed the play again in a 1930 talkie. This film is lost but its Vitaphone soundtrack survives.

Cast
Otis Skinner as Hajj the Beggar
Rosemary Theby as Kut-al-Kulub
Elinor Fair as Marsinah
Marguerite Comont as Nargis
Nicholas Dunaew as Nasir
Herschel Mayall as Jawan
Fred Lancaster as Zayd
Leon Bary as Caliph Abdullah
Sidney Smith as Jester
Hamilton Revelle as Wazir Mansur
Tom Kennedy as Kutayt
Sam Kaufman as Amru
Emmett King as Wazir Abu Bakr
Fanny Ferrari as Gulnar
Emily Seville as Kabirah

References

Bibliography
 Beauchamp, Cari. Joseph P. Kennedy's Hollywood Years. Faber and Faber, 2009

External links

Kismet; allmovie.com
Kramer, Fritzi (March 9, 2014), Kismet (1920) A Silent Film Review, at moviessilently.com

1920 films
American silent feature films
Films directed by Louis J. Gasnier
1920 drama films
Silent American drama films
American black-and-white films
Film Booking Offices of America films
1920s American films